Chiasmia simplicilinea is a moth in the  family Geometridae. It is found in eastern and southern Africa from Ethiopia to South Africa and in Ivory Coast & Madagascar.

Known foodplants of the larvae of this species are Mimosoideae, Acacia dealbata and Acacia mearnsii.

Subspecies
Chiasmia simplicilinea simplicilinea (Warren, 1905)
Chiasmia simplicilinea pagenstecheri  (Herbulot, 1978)

References

Macariini
Moths of the Comoros
Lepidoptera of Southern Africa
Lepidoptera of Tanzania
Moths of Madagascar
Moths of Sub-Saharan Africa
Moths described in 1905